Radmila Šekerinska Jankovska (born 10 June 1972) is the former defense minister of North Macedonia and a former leader of the Social Democratic Union of Macedonia (SDSM). Šekerinska was previously Deputy Prime Minister for European Integration and National Coordinator for Foreign Assistance of North Macedonia and also was the acting Prime Minister of North Macedonia from 12 May 2004 until 12 June 2004 and from 3 November 2004 until 15 December 2004. She was elected 5 November 2006 the SDUM leader. She is the first female (acting) prime minister of North Macedonia.

Šekerinska was elected President of the Social Democratic Union of Macedonia at the party Congress following a no-confidence motion against the former leader Vlado Bučkovski. She left the position after September 2008 party congress. Zoran Zaev was appointed as her successor until May 2009, when president Branko Crvenkovski's term ended.

During her term as a deputy Prime Minister responsible for European Affairs, the European Council, in December 2005, granted North Macedonia a status of candidate country for accession to the European Union.

Early life and education
Šekerinska holds a Master's Degree from The Fletcher School of Law and Diplomacy, Tufts University, which she obtained in 2007. She graduated in 1995 from Skopje's Faculty of Electrical Engineering with a degree in Power Engineering.

Political career
Šekerinska became involved in the Open Society Institute of George Soros and in 1996 won a seat on Skopje City Council, which she held until she was elected to the Macedonian parliament in 1998. She subsequently became the deputy chairwoman of the Social Democratic Union of Macedonia (SDSM). She is a member of the presidency of the Party of European Socialists with which the SDSM is associated.

From 1997 to 2002 Šekerinska worked as an assistant at the Faculty of Electrical Engineering in Skopje, while in 1998 she was elected for a member of the Assembly of the Republic of Macedonia . She was elected for a deputy coordinator of the parliamentary group of the Social-Democratic Union of Macedonia (SDUM) and was a member of several parliamentary committees.

Šekerinska received a second mandate as an MP at the parliamentary elections in 2002, when she was immediately assigned Vice Premier of the Republic of Macedonia responsible for European integration.

Šekerinska served as spokeswoman in Crvenkovski's successful campaign for the Macedonian presidency during March–April 2004. She then served as acting prime minister for three weeks after Crvenkovski resigned to become president. Šekerinska was reappointed deputy prime minister in the government of Crvenkovski's successor as prime minister, Hari Kostov, on 3 June 2004.

Šekerinska is an author of a number of scientific and expert works.

On 1 May 2018, Šekerinska and U.S. Defence Secretary James Mattis met at the Pentagon in Virginia to discuss the defense relationship between Macedonia and the United States. Additionally, the two discussed the naming dispute between Macedonia and Greece preventing the former's accession into the EU and NATO, as well as Macedonia's commitment to achieving 2% spending of GDP on defense.

On October 15 2022, she was elected as one of the vice-presidents of the Party of European Socialists.

Other activities
 European Council on Foreign Relations (ECFR), Member

Recognition
Šekerinska is a winner of "Global Leaders of Tomorrow" Prize, awarded under auspices of the World Economic Forum.

Notes

External links

 Šekerinska's profile on the government's official website 
 "Sekerinska elected leader of Macedonia's main opposition party" 6 November 2006 on setimes.com 
 Women Prime Ministers 1945 - 2007  

|-

1972 births
Living people
Female defence ministers
Defence ministers of North Macedonia
Deputy Prime Ministers of North Macedonia
Members of the Assembly of North Macedonia
Politicians from Skopje
Prime Ministers of North Macedonia
Social Democratic Union of Macedonia politicians
Women government ministers of North Macedonia
Women prime ministers
21st-century Macedonian women politicians
21st-century Macedonian politicians